Chris Kovarik  (born 1 March 1978, Dandenong, Victoria, Australia), is an Australian professional racing cyclist specialising in downhill mountain biking and four cross mountain bike racing. He is a multiple Australian national champion and multiple World Cup winner.

Cycling career
Kovarik started competitive cycling when he was 17 years old and has been a member of the Chain Reaction Cycles/Intense Cycle's MTB Race team  since its creation in 2008.  Kovarik was joined by fellow Intense rider Finland's Matti Lehikoinen for the 2010 race season.

In 2004, Kovarik shattered his ankle, broke the tibia on the same leg and spent 4½ months with a metal cage around his leg, leading to 7 months off the bike and missing the 2004 World Cup/Championship season.  At the time, doctors had said that he may never ride again, however, he went on to place 5th in the World Championships in New Zealand in 2005.

In 2008 Kovarik married teammate and fellow downhill mountain Bike rider, Canadian Claire Buchar.

Chris won the Australian National Downhill Championships in January 2010 at the SRAM Corporation Australian Mountain Bike Championships in Adelaide.

Kovarik's  career highlights include
 2006 - 1st World Cup : Mont Saint Anne 
 2005 - 5th World Championships : New Zealand 
 2002 - 1st World Cup : Fort William (won by 14 secs)
 2002 - Australian National Champ
 2001 - Australian National Champ
 2000 - Australian National Champ

Past Results

1998
 1st DH MTB National Series Round VIC
 2nd DH MTB National Series Round NSW

1999
 1st DH MTB Norba Series Mammoth Mountain USA
 1st DH Norba Series Deer Valley USA
 2nd DH MTB World Cup USA
 2nd DH Norba Series Mount Snow USA
 2nd DH MTB Australian Titles VIC
 2nd DH MTB National Series Round VIC
 3rd DL MTB Australian Titles NSW
 10th DH MTB World Cup USA

2000
 1st DH MTB Australian Titles QLD
 1st DH MTB Norba Series Round USA
 1st DH MTB National Series Round QLD
 1st DH MTB National Series Round VIC
 2nd DH MTB Norba Series Round USA
 3rd DL MTB National Series Round VIC
 7th DH MTB World Cup
 8th DH MTB World Cup USA
 10th DH MTB World Championships ESP
 11th DH MTB World Cup CAN

2001
 1st DH MTB Australian Titles VIC
 1st DH MTB World Cup CAN
 1st DH MTB National Series Round VIC
 2nd DH MTB World Cup CAN
 2nd DH MTB World Cup FRA
 3rd DH MTB Norba Series #1 USA
 3rd DH MTB Norba Series #3 USA
 4th DH MTB World Championships USA
 4th DL MTB World Cup CAN
 4th DH MTB World Cup #1
 5th DH MTB Norba Series 2 USA

2002
 1st DH MTB World Cup USA
 1st DH MTB World Cup GBR
 1st DH MTB World Cup SLO
 1st DH MTB Australian Titles NSW
 1st DH MTB Championships Series USA
 3rd DH MTB World Championships AUT
 3rd DH MTB National Points Series GBR
 4th National MTB Series USA
 5th DH MTB Mercury Sea Otter Classic USA
 5th 4X MTB Mercury Sea Otter Classic USA
 8th DH MTB World Cup FRA
 9th DH MTB World Cup CAN
 17th 4X MTB World Championships AUT

2003
 1st DH Norba Series #2 USA
 2nd DH MTB World Cup FRA
 2nd 4X Norba Series #3 USA
 4th DH MTB World Championships SUI
 5th 4X Norba Series #2 USA
 6th DH MTB World Cup GBR

2005
 2nd DH MTB World Cup #3 AUT
 3rd DH MTB World Cup #6 USA
 4th DH MTB World Cup #8 GBR
 4th DH MTB World Cup #2 GER
 5th DH MTB World Cup #4 CAN
 8th DH Australian MTB Championships VIC
 9th 4X MTB World Cup #6 USA
 11th 4X MTB World Cup #4 CAN
 17th DH MTB World Championships ITA
 41st DH MTB World Cup #7 ITA

2006
 1st DH MTB World Cup #4 CAN
 3rd 4X MTB World Cup #4 SCO
 3rd Australian DH MTB Championships VIC
 5th DH MTB World Championships NZL
 5th DH MTB World Cup #3 GER
 8th DH MTB World Cup #1 ESP
 9th DH MTB World Cup #6 AUT
 15th DH MTB World Cup #5 BRA
 20th DH MTB World Cup #4 SCO
 49th 4X MTB World Cup #1 ESP

2007
 7th 4X MTB World Cup #4 AUT
 23rd DH MTB World Cup #4 AUT
 38th DH MTB World Cup #1 ESP
 86th DH MTB World Championships GBR

2008
 6th MTB World Cup DH #2 Andorra
 12th DH MTB World Championships ITA

References

External links
 

1978 births
Living people
Australian male cyclists
Sportsmen from Victoria (Australia)
People from Dandenong, Victoria
Australian mountain bikers
Cyclists from Melbourne